This is a list of San Jose State Spartans football players in the NFL Draft.

Key

Selections

References

San Jose State

San Jose State Spartans in the NFL Draft
San Jose State Spartans NFL Draft